Benjamin S. Martin (June 27, 1921 – July 24, 2004) was an American football player and coach He served as the head football coach at the University of Virginia from 1956 to 1957 and the United States Air Force Academy from 1958 to 1977, compiling a career college football record of .

A native of Prospect Park, Pennsylvania, Martin played college football at Princeton University in 1941 and then moved to the United States Naval Academy; he was a member of the class of 1946, which graduated early in 1945 due to World War II. After sea duty on the USS Helena, Martin was an assistant coach at Navy from 1949 to 1954; that last team was 8–2, among the best in program history, and won the Sugar Bowl. His first team at Air Force in 1958 was undefeated (with two ties), played in the Cotton Bowl, and finished in the top ten in both polls.

Martin died at age 83 in 2004 in Colorado Springs, Colorado, and was buried in Maryland at the Naval Academy Cemetery. He was inducted into the Air Force Falcons Hall of Fame in 2009.

Head coaching record

References

External links
 

1921 births
2004 deaths
American football halfbacks
Air Force Falcons football coaches
Navy Midshipmen football coaches
Navy Midshipmen football players
Princeton Tigers football players
United States Football League announcers
Virginia Cavaliers football coaches
College football announcers
College men's track and field athletes in the United States
The Hill School alumni
Sportspeople from Delaware County, Pennsylvania
Coaches of American football from Pennsylvania
Players of American football from Pennsylvania
United States Navy personnel of World War II
United States Navy officers
Military personnel from Pennsylvania